Sylvicola punctatus is a species of fly in the family Anisopodidae. It is found in the  Palearctic .

References

External links
Images representing Sylvicola at BOLD

Anisopodidae
Insects described in 1787
Nematoceran flies of Europe
Taxa named by Johan Christian Fabricius